Midnight Crew can refer to:

 A group of police officers led by Jon Burge known for involvement in a torture scandal
 Midnight Crew, a gospel music quartet led by Pat Uwaje-King
 The Midnight Crew, a group of characters in Homestuck